Bethharan, Betharan or Beth Haran (for ), also Betharam or Beth-Aram (for Hebrew ; no linguistic relation to Aram), was a Hebrew Bible city, in the valley-plain east of the Jordan River. In the Book of Joshua, a city called "Betharam" is listed as one of the cities allotted by Moses to Gad, previously belonging to Sihon the Amorite. According to the Book of Numbers, "Betharan" was rebuilt by the tribe of Gad.

Classical-period city
Later, it is called , ( - ). In the 1st century AD it was fortified by Herod Antipas, the tetrarch of Galilee and Perea, who named it Livias in honor of Livia, the wife of the Roman emperor Augustus. As she was later called Julia, the 1st-century Jewish historian Josephus speaks of the city as Julias. Having been burnt at the fall of Jerusalem in AD 70, it was restored by the Christians and became a bishopric.

Identification
The Catholic Encyclopedia of 1913 stated that the site used to be "identified by some with Tell er-Rameh, six miles east of the Jordan, by others with Beit Harran" (the latter seems to be a mistranscription of the 1913 article)..

The team recently excavating Tell el-Hammam identifies both biblical Bethharan and classical Livias with their own excavation site.

References

Hebrew Bible cities
Torah cities
Former populated places in Jordan
Livias